Steven Alan Peters (born January 23, 1960) is a Canadian former professional ice hockey forward who played two games in the National Hockey League for the Colorado Rockies.

He was picked second overall, one spot ahead of Wayne Gretzky in the 1977 Ontario Major Junior Hockey League draft of 16-year-olds.

As a youth, he played in the 1972 and 1973 Quebec International Pee-Wee Hockey Tournaments with a minor ice hockey team from Peterborough, Ontario.

Career statistics

References

External links

1960 births
Living people
Canadian ice hockey centres
Colorado Rockies (NHL) draft picks
Colorado Rockies (NHL) players
Fort Worth Texans players
HIFK (ice hockey) players
Sportspeople from Peterborough, Ontario
Imatran Ketterä players
KooKoo players
Muskegon Mohawks players
Niagara Falls Flyers players
Oshawa Generals players
Peterborough Petes (ice hockey) players
SaiPa players
Tappara players
Windsor Spitfires players
Ice hockey people from Ontario
Canadian expatriate ice hockey players in Finland